Vasiliki Diamantopoulou (born 12 March 1993) is a Greek water polo player for NC Vouliagmeni and the Greece women's national water polo team.

She participated at the 2018 Women's European Water Polo Championship.

References

1993 births
Greek female water polo players
Living people
21st-century Greek women